Police Force is a Hindi crime action film released on 28 May 2004, directed by Dilip Shukla, starring Akshay Kumar, Raveena Tandon and Amrish Puri

Plot 
Police Academy trainer, Pandey, has been assigned to train some new recruits who are likely candidates for senior positions in India's Police Force. He does his best to train them, and get them assigned to their duties. What he is unable to teach them is about dishonest police officers, especially high-ranking ones; equally dishonest politicians, who have open links with gangsters and terrorists. These young men must now decide to carry on and compromise with this situation or become rebels and ultimately lose their jobs.

Cast

Akshay Kumar as Vijay Singh
Raveena Tandon as Roma
Amrish Puri as Training Officer Pandey
Mohan Joshi as Pratap Bhosle
Govind Namdeo as Dada Bhai
Aloknath as Police Commissioner Chaudhary
S. M. Zaheer as Mr. Singh
Raj Babbar as Raatan Sethi
Ashalata Wabgaonkar as Revati Singh
Achyut Potdar as Bade Babu
Payal Rohatgi Item Song
Rami Reddy as Kutty 
Vinay Apte as union leader Sawant
Jaspal Sandhu as Baburao (Raatan Sethi's assistant)
Deepraj Rana as Rana, batchmate and colleague of Vijay Singh in the Police Academy
Ganesh Yadav as Batchmate and Colleague of Vijay Singh (cameo)
Narendra Gupta as Saxena
Ghanashyam Nayak as Public Spectator
Santosh Gupta as Shanti Kumar, journalist (special appearance)

Soundtrack
The soundtrack of Police Force was composed by Anand–Milind, with lyrics penned by Sameer. The film has 8 original songs,  The soundtrack was released in 2004.

Track list

Critical response
Taran Adarsh of Bollywood Hungama gave the film 1 star out of 5, writing "None of the performances really stand out. Akshay goes through his role without much of an effort. His stunts are well executed of course. Raveena looks least interested in the goings-on. Amrish Puri gives a good account of himself. Raj Babbar tends to go over the top. Mohan Joshi is as usual. On the whole, POLICE FORCE has nothing forceful about it. Dull. Shruti Bhasin of Planet Bollywood gave a negative review stating "Our recommendation is that you check out a better quality cop flick such as Khakee or Ab Tak Chappan.".

References

External links

2000s Hindi-language films
2004 films
2004 action films
2000s crime drama films
Films scored by Anand–Milind
Fictional portrayals of police departments in India
2004 drama films